Khalid Ibrahim Jouma or خالد ابراهيم جمعة (born 25 December 1962) is a former Bahraini sprinter who competed in the men's 100m competition at the 1992 Summer Olympics. He recorded a 10.80, not enough to qualify for the next round past the heats. His personal best is 10.41, set in 1991. In 1992, he additionally ran the 200m, timed at 21.55. He also competed in the 1988 Summer Olympics in the 100m contest, clocked at 10.80.

References

1962 births
Living people
Bahraini male sprinters
Athletes (track and field) at the 1988 Summer Olympics
Athletes (track and field) at the 1992 Summer Olympics
Olympic athletes of Bahrain